Jesper Dahlroth (born July 29, 1991) is a Swedish professional ice hockey player. He is currently under contract with Frederikshavn White Hawks of the Fjordkraftligaen (Norway).

Playing career
Dahlroth made his professional debut in the Hockeyettan with Bodens HF before moving up the ranks to make his Elitserien debut in the 2009–10 season, playing a single game with Luleå HF. In the following season he moved to continue in the Elitserien with Timrå IK in the during the 2010–11 season.

References

External links

1991 births
Living people
Asplöven HC players
Fehérvár AV19 players
Frederikshavn White Hawks players
Luleå HF players
Modo Hockey players
IK Oskarshamn players
Timrå IK players
IF Sundsvall Hockey players
Swedish ice hockey defencemen